The first official international association football matches for each (present or past) member of FIFA are listed chronologically as follows:

List of first association football internationals per country: 1872–1940
List of first association football internationals per country: 1940–1962
List of first association football internationals per country: 1962–present

External links
Lists of Full Internationals of National Teams at RSSSF

 
Association football-related lists